Orleans is an American pop rock band best known for its hits "Dance with Me" (No. 6 in 1975); "Still the One" (No. 5 in 1976), from the album Waking and Dreaming; and "Love Takes Time" (No. 11 in 1979). The group's name evolved from the music it was playing at the time of their formation, which was inspired by Louisiana artists such as Allen Toussaint and the Neville Brothers.  Orleans was formed in Woodstock, New York in January 1972 by vocalist/guitarist/songwriter John Hall, vocalist/guitarist/keyboardist/bassist/songwriter Larry Hoppen and drummer/keyboardist/songwriter Wells Kelly.  In October of that year, the group expanded to include Larry's younger brother, Lance, on bass.  Drummer Jerry Marotta joined in 1976, completing the quintet.  (Hall was later elected to the United States House of Representatives.)

History

Early days
Drummer Wells Kelly (son of Cornell University's Dean of Architecture, Burnham Kelly) first met John Hall, an in-demand session player and member of the group Kangaroo, in the late 1960s when he played with him in a group called Thunderfrog and later played on John's first solo album, Action, released in 1970.

In 1969 Wells joined the first incarnation of King Harvest, who would have a hit four years later, in 1973, with the song "Dancing in the Moonlight"; a song written by Wells' brother, Sherman Kelly, and first recorded by Boffalongo, an Ithaca-based group Wells joined in 1970 after leaving King Harvest.

Hall and his wife, Johanna, had just gained some fame when their song "Half Moon" appeared on Janis Joplin's posthumous album Pearl. Hall, who had recorded and toured with Taj Mahal and Seals and Crofts, decided to relocate from New York City to Woodstock, New York, at the request of producer/pianist John Simon, to be close to Bearsville Studios and the musical scene there.

Larry Hoppen, who grew up in Bay Shore, Long Island, relocated to Ithaca, New York to attend college in the late 60s. He was a founding member of Boffalongo and had two albums released by United Artists. Sherman Kelly and "Dancin' in the Moonlight" appeared on the 2nd album. Wells Kelly had joined the band after that.

Forming the band
After a swing through Europe playing guitar behind Karen Dalton on a Santana tour, Hall decided to start his own band in Woodstock.  After months of playing the Café Expresso with different rhythm sections, Hall called his old friend Wells Kelly in Ithaca in December 1971 and asked him to join his group.  Multi-instrumentalist Kelly accepted the offer on the condition that he play piano.  For a brief time, the group consisted of Hall on guitar, Roy Markowitz on drums, Bill Gelber on bass and Kelly on electric piano.  When Markowitz and Gelber left the band, Wells told John about his former bandmate from the Ithaca-based Boffalongo.  Hall encouraged Kelly to call Larry Hoppen, who accepted the invitation to join the new group, christened "Orleans" by Wells in late January 1972. For months they would play as a trio, often switching instruments throughout the show.

Larry's 18-year-old brother, Lance Hoppen, was brought into Orleans around Halloween 1972 to play bass, freeing up Larry to play more guitar and keyboards.

Orleans found its core audience touring the clubs and college circuit of the Northeastern United States, crossing paths with other up-and-comers such as Bonnie Raitt, Tom Waits and Hall & Oates. Rolling Stone magazine called Orleans "the best unrecorded band in America". Showcase performances in New York gave rise to a recording contract with ABC Dunhill Records and the release of the eponymous debut album in the fall of 1973, which had been recorded in Muscle Shoals, Alabama with producers Roger Hawkins and Barry Beckett at the helm.

Reviewing Orleans in Christgau's Record Guide: Rock Albums of the Seventies (1981), Robert Christgau said, "In case you're interested, this band is mucho hot among Eastern rock cognoscenti (read, know-it-alls). Very pleasant, too, although John Hall doesn't sing as tasty as he plays. The only impressive song is 'Half Moon.' Anything Janis Joplin used to sing is impressive, so that may not mean much."

The group's second record, Orleans II, recorded at Bearsville Studios, was originally released in Europe in 1974 but ABC declined to release it in the US since management felt there were "no hit singles" on the album (despite the fact that it contained the first-version recordings of both "Let There Be Music" and "Dance With Me") and dropped the group from the label. After the band's later successes, Orleans II was finally put out in America in 1978, combined with the first album, as a double LP called Before the Dance. It was also released as a CD in Japan in the 1990s under its originally slated title Dance With Me.

Success
However, it was not until Orleans was heard at Max's Kansas City, signed and produced, by Chuck Plotkin, then head of A&R for Asylum Records, that the band scored its first Billboard Hot 100 charting single "Let There Be Music" (No. 55), taken from their third album, Let There Be Music, released in March 1975.

The follow-up single, "Dance With Me" (reshaped and re-recorded from Orleans II with Plotkin at the helm), brought Orleans to No. 6 on the pop charts and into the mainstream of American pop music. Atypical of the high-energy, earthy, R&B and Rock n' Roll mix of styles they had been previously identified with, "Dance With Me" cast the band in a more "soft-rock" light and landed them a tour with Melissa Manchester.

While recording their next album, Waking and Dreaming, in early 1976, the group was joined by second drummer Jerry Marotta, freeing Wells Kelly up to sing more and play keyboards.

"Still the One" (released in July 1976), from Waking and Dreaming, cemented Orleans' relationship with the American public.  While the single was climbing the charts to peak eventually at No. 5, the band did a major cross-country ten-week tour with label-mate Jackson Browne, ending in November 1976.

In January 1977 the single was chosen as the theme song for the ABC television network (the parent of ABC Records) and has since been used for an endless number of commercials and movie soundtracks.

John Hall departs
The follow-up, "Reach", with John Hall on lead, peaked at No. 51 in March 1977.  Around then, however, internal stresses and disagreements over material and musical direction prompted guitarist/songwriter Hall to announce his intention to leave the band in search of a solo career, which he did in June 1977 after touring commitments were satisfied.  Marotta departed not long afterwards to join Hall and Oates and eventually moved on to Peter Gabriel's band.

After several months of mulling things over and working with other musicians (Lance and Larry joined Jerry Marotta in the backing band for Garland Jeffreys while Kelly worked with the Beach Boys), the Hoppen brothers and Kelly decided to continue on in late 1977, bringing in new members Robert Martin (vocals, keyboards, sax, horns) and Connecticut musician Bob Leinbach (vocals, keyboards, trombone), who'd played with Larry Hoppen and the Kellys in Boffalongo during the Ithaca years and had completed a stint with the group the Fabulous Rhinestones. The new lineup signed a contract with the Infinity Records label and their debut there, Forever (April 1979), produced the No. 11 hit "Love Takes Time". Collectively, the three Hot 100 top 20 Orleans hits have been aired over 10 million times.

In 1979 Orleans continued to tour with artists such as Stephen Stills and Chicago.

1980s
In 1980 Infinity went bankrupt after an album with performances by Pope John Paul II (who was on a tour of the US in the fall of '79) failed to sell. Infinity was absorbed into MCA Records, who failed to promote their follow-up album, simply titled Orleans. This last, recorded in Woodstock, featured only the Hoppens and Wells Kelly as Orleans proper, since the others had left earlier in the year. Nonetheless, the album featured guest appearances from all past members, including John Hall, who was in the process of forming the John Hall Band with Leinbach as a member. Orleans was produced by Englishman Robin Lumley, mixed at Trident Studios in London and featured Lumley's friend, Phil Collins, contributing backing vocals to one track.

Just after recording that 1980 release, the group added Dennis "Fly" Amero (guitars, vocals) to replace Leinbach. The live lineup still featured Robert (R.A.) Martin and the band completed a tour of amusement parks that summer, only to learn that their accountant had misappropriated funds, leaving them in debt. Martin left, "Fly" stayed, Larry and Lance recruited their younger brother, Lane Hoppen, to play keyboards and drummer Charlie Shew (at that time going under the pseudonym Eric Charles) to play alongside Wells Kelly. Charlie then replaced Wells when he left by early 1981 to relocate to NYC.

Orleans then signed with the fledgling Radio Records and recorded their next album, One of a Kind, in Fort Lauderdale, Florida in the summer of '82. The album (released in September 1982) included brand new band member Michael Mugrage, replacing "Fly" Amero on guitar at the request of the album's producers, Don Silver and Ben Wisch. Jerry Marotta briefly rejoined the band to play on the album but was soon replaced by drummer Nicholas Parker after its release. But Radio Records, likewise, went bankrupt just as One of a Kind was hitting the record store shelves.

Back to the clubs
Now without a record label, Orleans struggled in the early 1980s, playing mostly small clubs in the Northeast. At this same time, Larry and Lance formed a side group, Mood Ring, with Bob Leinbach, Nicholas Parker, singer/songwriter Robbie Dupree (of "Steal Away" fame) and various other Woodstockers who drifted in and out to play for fun, mostly at parties and clubs. Mood Ring played some club dates in 1984 billed as Robbie Dupree and Orleans (In the late 2000s, Mood Ring reconvened to do occasional concert dates).

After a couple of draining years touring the Northeast club circuit, during a tough two-week stint in Bermuda in September 1984, Larry lost his voice just one day into the gig due to a combination of air-conditioning and high humidity. After this, he returned to his home in Woodstock and decided to take some time off to allow his voice to heal. At that low point, both Larry and Lance felt that was the likely end of Orleans.

Death of Wells Kelly
In the meantime, Kelly went on to join Steve Forbert's Flying Squirrels in 1981 and did a few shows in the Central New York area with Mick Ronson. He also played with Clarence Clemons and the Red Bank Rockers before joining Meat Loaf's Neverland Express in 1983. On October 29, 1984, Wells died while on tour in England with Meat Loaf. After a night of partying, his body was found on the front stairs of a London flat at which he was staying. According to pathologist Dr. Ian West, a post mortem examination revealed "high levels of morphine and cocaine" in Kelly's body. "Death came from the drummer inhaling his own vomit 'induced by snorting a mixture of heroin and cocaine'."

Wells Kelly's untimely death was the catalyst for a reunion of Hall and the Hoppen brothers.  John Hall and Bob Leinbach joined Larry in Ithaca, NY to play at a memorial for Wells (Lance was unable to make the wake due to another commitment). Having not played together for seven years, Larry and John rediscovered the magic of the combination.

Relocating to Nashville
Then in 1985, through the Halls' connections in Nashville, the reunited lineup of John Hall, Larry Hoppen, Lance Hoppen and Bob Leinbach cut the album Grown Up Children (June 1986), with guest appearances from heavyweights like Chet Atkins, Ricky Skaggs, Steve Wariner and Bela Fleck, under the direction of Nashville producer/MCA label chief Tony Brown. Though this album had some playing by John and Larry, most of the instrumental tracks were played by session players, including guitarist Richard Bennett, drummer Larrie London and bassist David Hungate, with the Orleans members providing mostly vocals.

During their Nashville period, the band added bassist Glen Worf and drummer Paul Cook (who was eventually replaced by Tommy Wells) for concert dates, as Lance switched to acoustic guitar.

Return to the Northeast
By late 1987, John and Larry began to realize that, while Nashville was a great place for them as songwriters, it was not so accommodating to Orleans' career as a band. For the next 2+ years, Orleans was in a fairly dormant state, again basing their activities back in Woodstock, NY. In early 1989, Lance was offered an opportunity to move to Nashville to work with old friends Kathie Baillie and Michael Bonagura as part of the then-hit RCA act, Baillie & the Boys. For a while, he was no longer available for all Orleans' gigs, so bassist Jim Curtin became Lance's sub, as needed, between 1989 and 1994. Meanwhile, New York native Peter O'Brien had been brought in on drums.

Orleans slowly re-established their presence in the Northeast over the next couple of years. In 1990 Robbie Dupree approached them to make a live album for their growing fan base in Japan. Two shows at Woodstock's Bearsville Theater were recorded on October 6 and 7, 1990, as John, Larry and Lance were joined by Bob Leinbach, Paul Branin (sax, guitar) and special guests: Rob Leon, John Sebastian, Jonell Mosser and Lane Hoppen.

The double Orleans Live CD set, culled from the two Bearsville Theater shows, came out in Japan in February 1991, followed in April by their first trip to perform in Japan (with a lineup of John, Larry, Lance, Leinbach, O'Brien and Paul Branin). 1993 saw the American release of Orleans Live: Volume 1, a single disc CD version and the first release on the band's own Major Records label. Live Volume 2, featuring the rest of the show, was soon to follow.

Still without a "traditional" label in the US, Orleans recorded a new album, Analog Men, for the Japanese label Pioneer. It came out there in 1994 and was followed by a return to Japan for more shows.

Later that year, Orleans played at Woodstock 94, which was practically in their backyard, in Saugerties, New York. Bob Leinbach once again rejoined the group for this show and continued to make occasional guest appearances with them throughout the 90s.

The following year found them touring as an acoustic trio (John, Larry and Lance). While most of the venues were small listening clubs, the real highlight of '95 was being the opening act on the Can't Stop Rockin tour with Fleetwood Mac, REO Speedwagon and Pat Benatar.

Yet another new album, Ride, was recorded at John's Saugerties studio and released through an independent label, Dinosaur Entertainment, out of New Orleans. Ride emerged in the summer of 1996 and included just a couple of reworkings of the best and still unheard-in-the-US tunes from Analog Men. The single "I Am on Your Side" even began to make its way up the charts, but the label proved inexperienced and it folded shortly afterward, killing the song's chances for more radio play.

Break up and resumption

Orleans continued on but, in late 1997, decided to take another break. John was spending more and more time writing in Nashville. Lance was touring with various Nashville-based artists and Larry, who'd remarried and started a family, relocated to Florida in 2000 and formed his own Larry Hoppen Band. Since 1997, Larry had also been involved with Voices of Classic Rock, who in 2003 became known as RPM (Rock & Pop Masters) This was a "supergroup" of lead singers of popular 70s/80s groups (Toto, Survivor, Santana, Rainbow, etc.), backed by a single world-class touring band.

In the summer of 2001, nearly four years after their last gig, Orleans (John Hall, Larry, Lance, Peter O'Brien and Bob Leinbach) reunited on Labor Day weekend to play the Opus 40 Amphitheatre in Saugerties. After this, the band decided to remain together and continue on. For some shows, the band included Peter and Bob. For others, Charlie Morgan (ex-Elton John) became the drummer and Lane Hoppen rejoined the band on keyboards. By 2005, Charlie and Lane had become permanent in their positions.

The band then picked up Jake Hooker, from Malibu, California, as their new manager.

Orleans continued to play live and record. A studio album, Dancin' in the Moonlight, was recorded in May and June 2004 at Charlie Morgan's Thynne Man Studios and first released in October 2005 on the CD Baby label. After this, the band's lineup was Larry, Lance and Lane Hoppen, Charlie Morgan and the returning Dennis "Fly" Amero (who replaced John Hall as he began his campaign for Congress in 2006) on guitar.

In 2007 Orleans released a live DVD/CD, We're Still Havin' Fun, recorded in August 2006 in Pittsfield, Massachusetts, which included both John Hall and "Fly" Amero, as well as the three Hoppen Brothers and drummer Charlie Morgan. Also appearing at this show were special guests: percussionist Manuel Quintana and Charles DeChant (from Hall & Oates) on sax.

Hall elected to Congress
During his 2006 bid for a US Congressional seat, Hall appeared with the group on only a few occasions. On November 7, 2006, Hall was elected as a Democrat to the United States House of Representatives from the state of New York. He was reelected in 2008. During the 2010 midterm elections, a political ad parody supporting John Hall's opponent, Nan Hayworth, promoted the fictitious organization "Young Voters for an Orleans Reunion Tour" as a means of voting Hall from Congress. Hayworth defeated Hall in the election.  He had served four years (two terms) representing District 19 in the Hudson Valley, between New York City and Albany, New York.

Orleans continued to write, record, and perform.  In 2010 there were repeat performances in both Washington, DC (in support of DCCC), and in Saint Thomas, U.S. Virgin Islands (fundraising for the Nana Baby Home, the orphanage there).

On July 24, 2012, founding band member Larry Hoppen took his own life.  Shows planned for the rest of the year were suddenly in jeopardy.  But Lance quickly announced that, although the band was in deep mourning for Larry, they had decided to finish the year's remaining dates (about 8) as best they could.  It was at this point that John Hall returned to the live lineup and other alumni joined them on various shows.  The first of those was 30 days later, in Deadwood, South Dakota, on August 24, 2012.  The group would then play a free show at SteelStacks on September 2 in memoriam and continued on from there.  On September 16, 2012, a memorial gathering of friends and family was held at the Bearsville Theater in Woodstock.  Bob Leinbach, among the performers, sang "Forever", a song he had written with Larry about undying friendship.

Orleans carried on to November 11, 2012, with a lineup consisting of John Hall, Dennis "Fly" Amero, Charlie Morgan, and Lance and Lane Hoppen, ending the year with a memorial show at Mercy Lounge in Nashville, joined by many artist supporters including Jimi Jamison, John Ford Coley, Henry Paul, Jonell Mosser, Kathie Baillie & Michael Bonagura, Pete Huttlinger and Bill Lloyd.  Again, it seemed to Lance that this would be the natural ending of Orleans' 40-year run.  But that was not to be.

In the summer of 2013, supported by new manager Len Fico, the band appeared as part of the "Sail Rock Tour", not only playing a set of their own hits, but providing back up for headliner Christopher Cross and contemporaries Firefall, Gary Wright, John Ford Coley, Robbie Dupree, Player and Al Stewart. That year also saw the release of The Last Band Standing DVD and the double-disc compilation CD, No More Than You Can Handle: A 40 Year Musical Journey, featuring several previously unreleased recordings. Among them is the title cut, which was the last in which Larry participated as co-writer, singer and player.

In the following years, Orleans continued to tour the US. Charlie Morgan departed in April 2018 and was replaced by drummer Brady Spencer.

In July 2019 John Hall announced his retirement from performing.  Daniel "Chip" Martin, a Nashville musician friend of Lance and Brady, then joined Orleans on guitar and vocals.  But John's "retirement" turned out to be a temporary sabbatical.  In March 2020 John was just about to return to touring when everything came to a halt due to the COVID-19 pandemic.

During the summer of 2021, Orleans resumed in person appearances and in August of that year, vocalist/guitarist Tom Lane came to fill in for an ill "Fly" Amero, then ended up taking his place permanently.

Most recently the band has released an "in isolation" video performance of "No More Than You Can Handle" in memory of Larry Hoppen and as an aid for those who are struggling with the challenges of these most difficult of times.

Starting in March 2022, the band toured as a quartet of Lance, Lane, Brady Spencer and Tom Lane after John Hall retired from the road once again. But shortly afterwards, they were a quintet once more when "Fly" Amero rejoined them again.

Members
 Current

Bold denotes members of the "classic lineup".

Lance Hoppen - bass, backing and lead vocals (1972–1989, 1994–1997, 2001–present)
Lane Hoppen - keyboards, backing vocals (1980–1984, 2003–present)
Dennis "Fly" Amero - vocals, guitar (1980–1982, 2006–2021, 2022–present)
Brady Spencer - drums, backing vocals (2018–present)
Tom Lane - vocals, guitar (2021–present)

 Former
John Hall - guitar, lead and backing vocals (1972–1977, 1985–1997, 2001–2006, 2012–2019, 2020–2022)
Larry Hoppen - keyboards, guitar, lead and backing vocals (1972–1997, 2001–2012; his death)
Wells Kelly - drums, keyboards, backing and lead vocals (1972–1981, died 1984)
Jerry Marotta - drums (1976–1977)
Bob Leinbach - keyboards, lead and backing vocals (1977–1980, 1985–1987, 1990–1994, 2001–2003)
Robert Martin - keyboards, backing vocals (1977–1980)
Charlie Shew - drums, backing vocals (1981–1982)
Nicholas Parker - drums (1982–1984)
Michael Mugrage - guitar, lead and backing vocals (1982–1984)
Paul Cook - drums (1985–1986)
Tommy Wells - drums (1986–1987)
Peter O'Brien - drums (1988–1997, 2001–2003)
Charlie Morgan - drums (2003–2018)
Jim Curtin - bass, backing vocals (1989–1994)
Paul Branin – saxophone, guitar (1990–1994)
Chip Martin - guitar, lead and backing vocals (2019–2020)

Band member timeline

Discography

Studio albums

Live albums
 Live (1991)
 Live Volume 2 (1993)
 Still the One, Live (2002)
 We're Still Havin' Fun (2007)

Compilations
 The ABC Collection (1976)
 Before the Dance (1978)
 Love Takes Time (1986)
 Dance with Me  – The Best of Orleans (1997)
 No More Than You Can Handle: A 40 Year Musical Journey (2013)
 Playlist: The Very Best of Orleans (2017)

Charting singles

References

External links
 

Rock music groups from New York (state)
American pop rock music groups
American soft rock music groups
Musical groups established in 1972
ABC Records artists
Asylum Records artists
MCA Records artists